is a one-volume Japanese slice of life seinen manga written and illustrated by Taeko Uzuki. It was published by East Press on May 18, 2012.

Characters
Taeko
Bobby

Reception
It was number three on the 2013 Kono Manga ga Sugoi! Top 20 Manga for Male Readers survey. It was also nominated for the 6th Manga Taishō, receiving 35 points and placing 8th among the eleven nominees.

References

2012 manga
Seinen manga
Slice of life anime and manga